Pașcani is a commune in Hîncești District, Moldova. It is composed of two villages, Pașcani and Pereni.

References

Communes of Hîncești District